P. japonica  may refer to:
 Paeonia japonica, a plant species native of the islands of northern Japan
 Parasteatoda japonica, a spider species in the genus Parasteatoda found in China, Taiwan, Korea and Japan
 Patanga japonica, a grasshopper species found in Japan 
 Peyssonnelia japonica, a red alga species
 Philbertia japonica, a sea snail species
 Pieris japonica, the Japanese andromeda, a plant species native to eastern Asia and Japan
 Pleodorina japonica, a colonial green alga species in the genus Pleodorina
 Pogonia japonica, an orchid species occurring from China to Japan
 Pollia japonica, the yabumyoga, a perennial flower species native to East Asia
 Polysiphonia japonica, a red alga species
 Popillia japonica, the Japanese beetle, an insect species 
 Prunus japonica, the Korean cherry, flowering almond or Oriental bush cherry, a shrub species
 Pseudotsuga japonica, the Japanese Douglas-fir, a conifer species endemic to Japan
 Pterygia japonica, a sea snail species

Synonyms
 Pseudotorynorrhina japonica, a synonym for Rhomborrhina japonica, a beetle species 
 Pterocarya japonica, a synonym for Pterocarya stenoptera, the Chinese wingnut, a tree species originally from Southeast China

See also
 Japonica (disambiguation)